Below are different types of weapons used during World War II by the People's Liberation Army, the National Revolutionary Army, and numerous warlord forces.

Small arms

Pistols (manual and semi-automatic)

Rifles

References 

 
China
Weapons